Alexei Sergeevich Travkin (born Moscow, 2 August 1977) is a former Russian rugby union player who played as a prop.

He played for VVA-Podmoskovye Monino, known as VVA Saracens until 2016.

He had 56 caps for Russia, from 2001 to 2011, scoring 1 try, 5 points on aggregate. He was called for the 2011 Rugby World Cup, playing in two games. He left the national team after the competition.

References

External links
Alexei Travkin International Statistics

1977 births
Living people
Russian rugby union players
Russia international rugby union players
VVA Podmoskovye players
Rugby union props
Sportspeople from Moscow